See also the Romanesque architecture erected by the Normans at Norman architecture.

The architecture of Normandy spans a thousand years.

Vernacular domestic styles 

In Upper Normandy and in the pays d'Auge, Mortainais, Passais and Avranchin (Lower Normandy), the vernacular domestic architecture is typically half-timbered and thatched.

The half-timbered farmhouses scattered across the countryside are inherited from an older tradition that has its roots in the Celtic farms, the remains of which have been excavated by archeologists. A particular style of farmstead called clos masure or cour-masure developed in the Pays de Caux as a result of the harsher landscape of that area and local tradition, which has been influenced by English and Danish styles.

Brick and flintstone were later used to build or rebuild some of the cottages and public buildings, such as town halls. Some villages of the pays de Caux and the Pays de Bray were entirely rebuilt this way.

The other parts of Lower Normandy, especially the Cotentin Peninsula, tends to use granite as the predominant local building material. The Channel Islands also share this influence – Chausey was for many years a source of quarried granite, including stone for the construction of Mont Saint-Michel. The Caen plain and the area of Bessin use the traditional unusually hard limestone, called Caen stone.

Urban vernacular style 
Like almost everywhere in France, the oldest houses in the main cities are half-timbered, but there are more widespread in Haute-Normandie and there are more recent examples.

Unfortunately, the urban architectural heritage of mainland Normandy was badly damaged during the Battle of Normandy in 1944. Many historic urban centres were destroyed, notably in Caen, Rouen, Lisieux and perhaps most tragically in Valognes, once known as the "Versailles of Normandy" for its aristocratic mansions and palaces. Massive post-war urban reconstruction in the 1950s and 1960s, such as in Le Havre and Saint-Lô, has left modernist interventions.

Castles and manors in Normandy 

One of the particularities of this region is that one can discover a lot of castles and manors during a journey. That part of the French territory has been marked by the presence of the English administration and troops before, and during the hundred years war. The religious wars gave to this region a typical style of buildings as well. From the late middle ages to the renaissance, Normandy evolved under England's architectural influence. That's why there are so many manors there. This type of building can only be found in Normandy and Brittany, in France. It has been brought by the English administration under the reigns of the plantagenets. The manoir du Catel and the Manoir du Clap are quite typical of that kind of architecture.

From the 17th century to the end of the 19th, Normandy became a very flourishing earldom and many noble families decided to build castles there. The castle is not a defending place anymore, and becomes a reflection of one's wealth. The chateau de Bosmelet is an example of that type of chateau.

Ecclesiastical architecture 
The confident church architecture such as at Lessay and Bayeux has left its mark on the landscape, as well as an artistic legacy in literature and in art, for example Claude Monet's series of Impressionist paintings of the Rouen Cathedral's Gothic facade.

 Abbey of Jumièges, near Rouen (ruins)
 Abbey of Mont Saint-Michel, Normandy (continued in Gothic style)
 Abbey of Bec
 Two abbeys at Caen founded by William the Conqueror

Fin de siècle architecture in Normandy
The south part of Bagnoles-de-l'Orne, which is called Belle Époque district is filled with superb bourgeois villas with polychrome façades, bow windows and unique roofing. This area, built between 1886 and 1914, has an authentic "Bagnolese" style and is typical of high-society country vacation of the time.

Gallery

References

Norman culture
Norman architecture
Normandy
Normandy